Through the Valley is a novel by Robert Henriques, published in 1950, about the decline of an English country house, Neapcaster Park, before and after World War II.  The book follows the growing up of three boys: Geoff, son of the estate manager Richard Greenley who grows up in the lodge and goes out hunting with the estate family; Ralph, son of General Harry Meredith, the owner of the estate; and David son of Daniel Levine, an intelligent but physically clumsy Jew.

Plot
In the first scene, set around a major hunt, Miss May one of the servants at the park, is seduced by Frank the footman. Subsequently, they marry. Frank becomes a taxi driver, and his gradual rise in the world mirrors the decline of the estate. That same night the three boys go clambering over the roof of Neapcaster Park. David falls, and it appears to be Ralph's fault. The friction between David and Ralph runs through the novel.

Another major character is Alex, a distant relative. She grows up abroad and only comes into the story in the second part.  She marries Ralph but loves Geoff and in the end they are united.

Awards and nominations
This novel won the James Tait Black Award in 1950.

References

1950 British novels
William Collins, Sons books